Kimberly Daniels (born June 12, 1961) is an American minister, religious author, politician, wife and mother of four from Jacksonville, Florida. She is a member of the Florida House of Representatives, representing House District 14 (part of Duval County. She began her political career as an at-large member of the Jacksonville City Council. She served as a member of the Florida House of Representatives, representing House District 14 (part of Duval County) as a member of the Democratic Party from 2016-2020. On the last day of qualifying for the 2022 election, Daniels entered the race for the House District 14 seat in 2022. On August 23, 2022, she easily took the Democratic Primary for House District 14, winning all of the district’s 41 precincts. Shortly thereafter, the write-in candidate withdrew from the race, securing Daniels’ return to the Florida House of Representative.

Personal life
Daniels is a graduate of Florida State University where she obtained a bachelor's degree in Criminology. Daniels has a master's degree in Christian Education and a Doctorate in Christian Counseling from the unaccredited Jacksonville Theological Seminary. Daniels' book Breaking the Power of Familiar Spirits is now a class textbook at JTS.

Daniels has expressed thankfulness to God for slavery and for her time in a crackhouse (she is a self-described former sex worker and drug addict), which she saw as ultimately leading to her religious conversion: "If it wasn’t for slavery, I might be somewhere in Africa worshipping a tree." Daniels also said, "You can talk about the Holocaust, but the Jews own everything."

In 2011 Daniels was elected to the Jacksonville City Council as an at-large member. On March 9, 2015, then-City Councilwoman Daniels was involved in a profanity-laced squabble with council candidate Sirretta Williams, also a local minister. She lost her bid for re-election in 2015, 55% to 45%. Her Republican opponent received support from LGBT groups and white liberals due to Daniels' controversial views and financial problems.

Daniels and her husband Ardell were divorced in 2015/6.

Florida House of Representatives
Daniels was first nominated to the House in 2016 (incumbent Mia L. Jones could not run due to term limits), winning the Democratic nomination with 6781 votes (35.99%	of the vote) in the primary election, defeating attorney Leslie Jean-Bart (31.32%) and three other candidates. In the general election she easily defeated Republican nominee Christian Whitfield, taking just over two-thirds of the vote.

In March 2017, it was reported that Daniels was under investigation by the Florida Elections Commission after it found probable cause that she used campaign funds for personal expenses and later falsely reported information on finance reports.

In early 2018, Daniels introduced HB 839, a bill that requires public schools to display the motto "In God We Trust" in a conspicuous place. On Tuesday, January 23, 2018, the bill received unanimous approval from the House PreK-12 Innovation Subcommittee. Later, in a vote on February 21, 2018, the bill passed 97 to 10 in the House. The measure was eventually adopted as law in March 2019 as part of an education bill.

On August 28, 2018, Daniels defeated educator Paula Wright in the Democratic primary for her seat. She did not have a Republican opponent, and conspicuously drew campaign support from Republican officeholders and donors.

In early 2019, Daniels sponsored legislation to require schools to teach courses on the Bible. The Florida House PreK-12 Quality Subcommittee approved the measure.

Daniels championed a $1 million-dollar contract for SCLC World Wide, run by Reverend Gary Johnson. In the summer of 2019, Florida Department of Juvenile Justice sued SCLC World Wide for not delivering on its commitments. The following day, Daniels was sued by a former staffer, Karen Riggien, who claimed to have been wrongfully fired in February 2018 in connection with interactions with Gary Johnson, a man Riggien described as Daniels' boyfriend.

On July 23, 2019, the Freedom from Religion Foundation wrote to Representative Daniels requesting that she stop blocking users on Facebook.

On August 18, 2020, Daniels lost renomination in the Democratic primary election to Angie Nixon.

Authored works

References

External links
Apostle Kimberly Daniels Ministries International
BREAKING THE POWER OF FAMILIAR SPIRITS by Kim Daniels

21st-century American politicians
21st-century American women writers
21st-century American women politicians
African-American state legislators in Florida
African-American women in politics
Christian writers
Florida State University alumni
Living people
Jacksonville, Florida City Council members
Democratic Party members of the Florida House of Representatives
Women state legislators in Florida
Women city councillors in Florida
American prostitutes
American exorcists
American women writers
African-American city council members in Florida
21st-century African-American women writers
21st-century African-American writers
1961 births